Business as usual (BAU), the normal execution of standard functional operations within an organisation, forms a possible contrast to projects or programmes which might introduce change. BAU may also stand in contradistinction to external events which may have the effect of unsettling or distracting those inside an organisation.

Goals
The maintenance of BAU is the primary goal of business continuity planning (BCP).

In climatology
"Business as usual" is a phrase is frequently used in climate change studies to warn of the dangers of not implementing changes in order to prevent the world from warming further.

See also 
 Business continuity planning
 Business operations
 Conceptual framework

References
 

Business continuity